In Greek mythology, Icarus was the son of the master craftsman Daedalus, the architect of the labyrinth of Crete. After Theseus, king of Athens and enemy of Minos, escaped from the labyrinth, King Minos suspected that Icarus and Daedalus had revealed the labyrinth's secrets and imprisoned them—either in a large tower overlooking the ocean or the labyrinth itself, depending upon the account. Icarus and Daedalus escaped using wings Daedalus constructed from feathers, threads from blankets, clothes, and beeswax. Daedalus warned Icarus first of complacency and then of hubris, instructing him to fly neither too low nor too high, lest the sea's dampness clog his wings or the sun's heat melt them. Icarus ignored Daedalus’ instructions not to fly too close to the sun, causing the beeswax in his wings to melt. Icarus fell from the sky, plunged into the sea, and drowned. The myth gave rise to the idiom, "fly too close to the sun."

In some versions of the tale, Daedalus and Icarus escape by ship.

The legend 

Icarus's father Daedalus, a very talented Athenian craftsman, built a labyrinth for King Minos of Crete near his palace at Knossos to imprison the Minotaur, a half-man, half-bull monster born of his wife and the Cretan bull. Minos imprisoned Daedalus himself in the labyrinth because he gave Minos's daughter, Ariadne, a clew (or ball of string) in order to help Theseus escape the labyrinth and defeat the Minotaur.

Daedalus fashioned two pairs of wings out of beeswax and feathers for himself and his son. Before trying to escape the island, he warned his son not to fly too close to the sun, nor too close to the sea, but to follow his path of flight. Overcome by giddiness while flying, Icarus disobeyed his father and soared into the sky. He came too close to the sun, and the heat melted the beeswax holding his feathers together. One by one, Icarus's feathers fell like snowflakes. Icarus was flapping his "wings". But he realized that he had no feathers left and that he was flapping his bare arms. Then he fell into the sea and drowned. Daedalus wept for his son and called the nearest land Icaria (an island southwest of Samos) in memory of him. Today, the supposed site of his burial on the island bears his name, and the sea near Icaria in which he drowned is called the Icarian Sea. With much grief, Daedalus went to the temple of Apollo in Sicily, and hung up his own wings as an offering to never attempt to fly again. According to scholia on Euripides, Icarus fashioned himself greater than Helios, the Sun himself, and the god punished him by directing his powerful rays at him, melting the beeswax. Afterwards, it was Helios who named the Icarian Sea after Icarus.

Hellenistic writers give euhemerising variants in which the escape from Crete was actually by boat, provided by Pasiphaë, for which Daedalus invented the first sails, to outstrip Minos' pursuing galleys, that Icarus fell overboard en route to Sicily and drowned, and that Heracles erected a tomb for him.

Classical literature 

Icarus' flight was often alluded to by Greek poets in passing and was told briefly in Pseudo-Apollodorus. Augustan writers who wrote about it in Latin include Hyginus, who tells in Fabula of the bovine love affair of Pasiphaë, daughter of the Sun, that resulted in the birth of the Minotaur, as well as Ovid, who tells the story of Icarus at some length in the Metamorphoses (viii.183–235), and refers to it elsewhere.

Medieval, Renaissance, and modern literature 

Ovid's version of the Icarus myth and its connection to Phaethon influenced the mythological tradition in English literature reflected in the writings of Chaucer, Marlowe, Shakespeare, Milton, and Joyce.

In Renaissance iconography, the significance of Icarus depends on context: in the Orion Fountain at Messina, he is one of many figures associated with water; but he is also shown on the Bankruptcy Court of the Amsterdam Town Hall – where he symbolizes high-flying ambition. The 16th-century painting Landscape with the Fall of Icarus,) attributed to Pieter Bruegel the Elder, was the inspiration for two of the 20th century's most notable ekphrastic English-language poems, "Musée des Beaux Arts" by W. H. Auden and "Landscape with the Fall of Icarus" by William Carlos Williams. Other English-language poems referencing the Icarus myth are "To a Friend Whose Work Has Come to Triumph" by Anne Sexton; "Icarus Again" by Alan Devenish; "Mrs Icarus" by Carol Ann Duffy; "Failing and Flying" by Jack Gilbert; "It Should Have Been Winter" by Nancy Chen Long, "Up like Icarus" by Mark Antony Owen, and "Yesterday's Myth" by Jennifer Chang. While the myth is a major subtext throughout Hiromi Yoshida's Icarus trilogy poetry chapbooks, Icarus is a metaphor for troubled modern young men in the Norwegian Axel Jensen's novel Icarus: A Young Man in Sahara (1957).

Interpretation 

Literary interpretation has considered the myth of Icarus as a consequence of excessive ambition. An Icarus-related study of the Daedalus myth was published by the French hellenist Françoise Frontisi-Ducroux. In psychology, there have been synthetic studies of the Icarus complex with respect to the alleged relationship between fascination for fire, enuresis, high ambition, and Ascensionism. The term Icarus complex is defined by NGHIALAGI.net as, "A form of overcompensation wherein an individual, due to feelings of inferiority, formulates grandiose aspirations for future achievement despite lacking proper talent, experience, and/or personal connections. Such a person often exhibits elitism fueled by hubris and detachment from social reality." In the psychiatric mind, features of disease were perceived in the shape of the pendulous emotional ecstatic-high and depressive-low of bipolar disorder. Henry Murray having proposed the term Icarus complex, apparently found symptoms particularly in mania where a person is fond of heights, fascinated by both fire and water, narcissistic and observed with fantastical or far-fetched imaginary cognition. Seth Godin's 2012 The Icarus Deception, points to the historical change in how Western culture both propagated and interpreted the Icarus myth arguing that "We tend to forget that Icarus was also warned not to fly too low, because seawater would ruin the lift in his wings. Flying too low is even more dangerous than flying too high, because it feels deceptively safe." Each study and analysis of the myth agrees Icarus was too ambitious for his own good.

See also 

 Bladud, a legendary king of the Britons, purported to have met his death when his constructed wings failed 
 Etana, a sort of "Babylonian Icarus"
 Kua Fu, a Chinese myth about a giant who chased the sun and died while getting too close
 Sampati, an Indian myth about a bird which lost its wings while trying to save its younger brother from the sun

References

Further reading 
 Graves, Robert, (1955) 1960. The Greek Myths, section 92 passim
 Pinsent, J. (1982). Greek Mythology. New York: Peter Bedrick Books
 Smith, William, ed. A Dictionary of Greek and Roman Biography and Mythology

Metamorphoses characters
Sun myths
Cretan characters in Greek mythology
Legendary flying machines
Artificial wings
Helios in mythology